Leigh Allen "Polly" Wallace (February 10, 1898 – February 9, 1971) was an American football player, wrestler and wrestling coach.

Wallace graduated from Oklahoma City High School in 1916, where he played football and basketball. He then played football at the center position for the Iowa State Cyclones football team.  His athletic career was interrupted by military service during World War I.  He returned to Iowa State after the war and was selected by Walter Eckersall as a first-team player on the 1920 College Football All-America Team.  He subsequently played for the Oklahoma Sooners football team and won third-team honors from the Associated Press on the 1926 College Football All-America Team

Wallace later became the wrestling coach at the University of Oklahoma. In his later years, he lived in Great Falls, Montana, where he owned a lumber yard.  He died in 1971 and was posthumously inducted into the Iowa State Hall of Fame in 2000.

Wallace served as the head football coach and athletic director at Cornell College in Mount Vernon, Iowa in 1924. He was the head football coach at East Central University (then known as East Central State Normal School) in Ada, Oklahoma form 1927 to 1933.

Wallace was the father of Epsicopalian bishop Leigh A. Wallace Jr.

Head coaching record

Football

References

External links
 

1898 births
1971 deaths
American football centers
Cornell Rams athletic directors
Cornell Rams football coaches
East Central Tigers football coaches
Iowa State Cyclones football players
Oklahoma Sooners football players
Oklahoma Sooners wrestling coaches
All-American college football players
Sportspeople from Great Falls, Montana
Sportspeople from Oklahoma City
Players of American football from Oklahoma